Goldplated is an eight-part drama series from World Productions which made its debut on Channel 4 on Wednesday 18 October 2006 at 10.00pm. It was created by Jimmy Gardner. It follows self-made businessman John White (played by David Schofield), as he struggles to complete a business deal that could be compromised by past indiscretions.

Plot
Similarly to The Sopranos (which the show has been compared to) White's personal life is intertwined with his business life. He lives in Northern England with his partner Cassidy, who is half his age, and their son, while in the process of divorcing his wife Beth (Barbara Marten). His oldest son Darren is his business partner, while his other two children with Beth also feature. Kenny Doughty also stars in 4 episodes as Cassidy's love interest.

Characters
 John White, played by David Schofield
 Beth White, played by Barbara Marten
 Justin White, played by Nicholas Shaw
 Lauren White, played by Jaime Winstone
 Terese White, Played by Poppy Miller
 Darren White, played by Darren Tighe
 Cassidy, played by Kelly Harrison
 Coll, played by Kenny Doughty

Filming locations
Over 50 per cent of the filming takes place in The Borough of Macclesfield in Cheshire on the edge of the Pennines, in Northern England.
 Alderley Edge, Cheshire as Alderley Edge
 Brasingamens Pub, Alderley Edge, Cheshire as the Nightclub
 Over Alderley National Trust, Cheshire as various
 Knutsford The house location, Cheshire
 De Vere Mottram Hall, Mottram, Macclesfield, Cheshire
 Mere Country Golf Club, Knutsford, Cheshire
 Hale Barns, Greater Manchester

Episode list

Reception
Despite a massive promotional effort that included a nationwide poster campaign featuring giant Gold Credit cards across Great Britain the drama fared poorly in the ratings, drawing only 1.4 million viewers for its opening episode. Reviews were not much better: Matt Baylis of The Daily Express described it as 'a string of cliches long ago exhausted by older and better shows'; Ian Johns of The Times was confused about the tone, but praised the team behind the series.

References

External links
Goldplated at Channel4.com

2006 British television series debuts
2006 British television series endings
2000s British drama television series
Channel 4 television dramas
English-language television shows
Television shows set in the United Kingdom
Television shows set in Cheshire